"I Know How" is a song written and originally performed by American country music artist Loretta Lynn. It was released as a single in February 1970 via Decca Records.

Background and reception 
"I Know How" was recorded at the Bradley's Barn on December 23, 1969. Located in Mount Juliet, Tennessee, the session was produced by renowned country music producer Owen Bradley. Two additional tracks were recorded during this session.

"I Know How" reached number four on the Billboard Hot Country Singles survey in 1970. The song became her seventeenth top ten single on the country chart. Additionally, the song peaked at number thirteen on the Canadian RPM Country Songs chart during this same period. It was included on her studio album, Loretta Lynn Writes 'Em & Sings 'Em (1970).

Track listings 
7" vinyl single
 "I Know How" – 2:31
 "Journey to the End of My World" – 2:30

Charts

Weekly charts

References 

1970 songs
1970 singles
Decca Records singles
Loretta Lynn songs
Songs written by Loretta Lynn
Song recordings produced by Owen Bradley